The Archaeological Museum of Paros is a museum located in Parikia on Paros, Greece. The museum was found in 1960 and consists of two rooms and an atrium.

Museum plan
Room A contains Archaic and Classical sculptures. Room B contains pottery, sculptures, and small finds from the Neolithic to the Roman period. The atrium contains sculptures, architectural parts, urns, and a Roman period mosaic floor.

Notable exhibits
Parian Marble (The shorter fragment base of the Stele).
Cycladian Frying Pan
Gorgon of Paros Marble statue, 6th century BCE.
Fat (or Naked) Lady of Saliagos. The oldest known Cycladic figurine.
The Nike of Paros. An early classical depiction of Nike in marble.
Large amphora, 7th c BC (B2652)

References

External links
Ministry of Culture and Sports, Odesseys, Archaeological Museum of Paros
Parosweb Archaeological Museum of Paros

Paros
Paros